Disposal may refer to:

 Bomb disposal, the process by which hazardous explosive devices are rendered safe
 Dispose pattern in computer programming
 Disposal of human corpses, the practice and process of dealing with the remains of a deceased human being
 Disposal tax effect, a concept in economics
 Garbage disposal, a device installed under a kitchen sink between the sink's drain and the trap which shreds food waste into pieces small enough to pass through plumbing
 Ship disposal, the disposing of a ship after it has reached the end of its effective or economic service life with an organisation
 Waste disposal, the getting rid of waste materials
 Disposal, a statistic in Australian rules football referring to kicks or handballs.
Free disposal, the possibility of discarding resources without economic costs.

See also

 Disposition (disambiguation)
Disposable